Bathybates is a genus of piscivorous cichlids endemic to Lake Tanganyika in East Africa. The genus includes both pelagic species that mainly feed on Tanganyika sardines and benthic species that mainly feed on other cichlids.

They are elongated in shape with a silvery color and a dark spotted or striped pattern.

Although not closely related, they have sometimes been compared to piscivorous Rhamphochromis cichlids of Lake Malawi.

Species
There are currently seven recognized species in this genus:

 Bathybates fasciatus Boulenger, 1901	  
 Bathybates ferox Boulenger, 1898	  
 Bathybates graueri Steindachner, 1911	  
 Bathybates hornii Steindachner, 1911	  
 Bathybates leo Poll, 1956	  
 Bathybates minor Boulenger, 1906	  
 Bathybates vittatus Boulenger, 1914

References

 
Bathybatini

Cichlid genera
Taxa named by George Albert Boulenger